Ancylistes biacutus is a species of beetle in the family Cerambycidae. It was described by Breuning in 1957.

References

Ancylistes
Beetles described in 1957